Billingford is a village and civil parish in the Breckland district of Norfolk, England, about  north of East Dereham. The village is just north of the River Wensum, which forms the southern boundary of the parish. The village is on the B1145 road, which links King's Lynn and Mundesley. The 2011 Census recorded the parish population as 253.

Billingford is in the Upper Wensum ward of Breckland District Council and the Elmham and Mattishall division of Norfolk County Council.

Archaeology

West of the village, between Elmham Road and the River Wensum, is the site of a Romano-British settlement. The site is unusual in having evidence that occupation continued into the early Anglo-Saxon period. The site is a Scheduled Ancient Monument.

Artefacts recovered from the site include a gold amulet.

Toponym
The Domesday Book of 1086 records the toponym as Billinge-forda. An entry for 1212 in the Book of Fees records it as Billingeford. It is derived from Old English and means "the ford of Billa's people".

Parish church
The earliest part of the Church of England parish church of St Peter is the baptismal font, which is 13th-century. The present building is largely 14th-century, built of flint and has an octagonal west tower. The church is a Grade I listed building.

References

Bibliography

External links

 Billingford Parish Council

 
Villages in Norfolk
Civil parishes in Norfolk
Breckland District